Gunnin' for Glory is a compilation album by American glam metal band Nitro, consisting of older demos from the O.F.R. and H.W.D.W.S. sessions, as well as three tracks by Batio's former band, the Michael Angelo Band.

Track listing

Personnel

Nitro
Jim Gillette – vocals
Michael Angelo – guitars, bass, backing vocals, production, executive production
T.J. Racer – bass
Paul Cammarata – drums
Bobby Rock – drums on "Freight Train"

Michael Angelo Band
Michael Cordet – vocals
Michael Angelo – guitars, bass, backing vocals, production, executive production
Allen Hearn – bass, backing vocals
Paul Cammarata – drums

References

External links
Michael Angelo Batio official site

Nitro (band) albums
1998 compilation albums